Polly Maton (born 23 October 1999) is a British para sprinter and long jumper. Maton was born without her right arm, runs with a prosthetic arm and competes in the T47 category. She won her first gold medals at the IWAS Junior Championships at the age of 14.

Education 
Maton attended Urchfont C of E Primary School and went on to complete her GCSEs and A Levels at Dauntsey's School. She is currently reading History and Politics at the University of Oxford.

References

1999 births
Living people
Sportspeople from Wiltshire
Athletes (track and field) at the 2016 Summer Paralympics
Team Bath Paralympic athletes
Team Bath track and field athletes
Athletes (track and field) at the 2020 Summer Paralympics